Osmia aliciae is a species of bee in the family Megachilidae.

Description
Females of this species  are distinguished from every North American mason bee except Osmia gonzalezi, by the many, prominent screw shaped hair strands on the clypeus, frons, and the vertex. Males are known by the dull, strongly granulose integument of the frons between the very close punctures.

References

aliciae
Hymenoptera of North America